The Big Mountain Short Film Festival is a short film festival based in Ohakune, New Zealand designed to encourage and celebrate creative short film making and storytelling.  Entry is free and open to filmmakers internationally, who are encouraged to use maximum creativity on minimum budget. In addition to screening short films, the festival also features professional guest speakers offering tips and techniques on an assortment of topics of particular interest to low and no-budget filmmakers.

The festival was run as a three-day event in 2006 and 2007, before being reformatted as a single-day event, beginning in 2008.

History 

The first annual Big Mountain Short Film Festival was held on October 20–22, 2006 at the Ohakune Cinema on Goldfinch Street in Ohakune. It was co-founded by filmmakers Jeff Bollow and Bret Gibson as a way to encourage and inspire filmmaking in New Zealand.

From the beginning, the Big Mountain Short Film Festival was conceived as an entirely free event, both for filmmakers submitting their films, and for audiences attending the festival.

The 2006 festival

Overview 

The festival screened 34 short films from 14 countries, 6 educational interviews with industry professionals, the full presentation of the ATOM Award-winning Making Fantastic Short Films, and two live presentations.

Short films were screened in two distinct categories.  Program A included short films made with budgets of over $1,000 or which are made with professional equipment and crews.  Program B included short films made with budgets of less than $1,000 which are made with home video cameras and personal computer editing systems

Winning films

The 2007 festival

Overview 

The festival returned to the Ohakune Cinema on October 19–21, 2007.  It featured 28 short films from 15 countries, educational content from New Zealand and international filmmakers, and live Q&A with Paul Davis, producer of New Zealand feature films "Sione's Wedding" and "We're Here to Help".

Winning films

The 2008 festival

Overview 

In 2008, the festival shifted gears, and returned to Ohakune as a single-day event on October 25, 2008.  It featured 28 short films from 13 countries.

Winning films

The 2009 festival

Overview 

In 2009, the festival returned to Ohakune as a single-day event on October 24, 2009.

Winning films

The 2010 festival 

The 5th Annual festival is scheduled to return to Ohakune Cinema as a single-day event on October 23, 2010.

Notable participants 

In addition to the international films featuring emerging and famous filmmakers from around the world, the following people have participated in the festival, either as speakers, live presenters, featured filmmakers or interview subjects:

 Alun Bollinger, Cinematographer of Heavenly Creatures
 David Coulson, Editor of Whale Rider
 Dale G Bradley, Director/Producer of over 20 films in New Zealand
 Paul Davis, Producer of Sione's Wedding and We're Here to Help
 Susan Parker, Production Manager of The Last Samurai and In My Father's Den
 Jackie Dennis, Music Licensing, Mushroom Music NZ

References

External links
Big Mountain Short Film Festival official site

Short film festivals in New Zealand